Paul Demange may refer to:

 Paul Demange (politician) (1906–1970), French politician
 Paul Demange (actor) (1901–1983), French actor